Lady Dynamite is an American comedy series starring Maria Bamford, and is loosely based on her life. It was created by Pam Brady and Mitch Hurwitz, on Netflix. The twelve-episode first season was released in its entirety on May 20, 2016. The series was renewed for a second season on July 27, 2016. The second season premiered on November 10, 2017. On January 13, 2018, the series was canceled after two seasons.

Premise
Stand-up comedian/actor Maria Bamford (portrayed by herself) moves back to Los Angeles after spending six months away in recovery for bipolar disorder and attempts to build up her life from scratch with the help of her agent Bruce Ben-Bacharach (Fred Melamed). Throughout the entire first season, flashbacks are employed to gain an insight on Maria's backstory and her relationships with her family and friends.

Cast

Main 

 Maria Bamford as Maria Bamford, a fictionalized version of herself
 Bamford also provides the voice of Blueberry, Scott's dog
 Fred Melamed as Bruce Ben-Bacharach, Maria's manager
 Mary Kay Place as Marilyn Bamford, Maria's mother
 Ólafur Darri Ólafsson as Scott, Maria's boyfriend (season 2, recurring season 1)

Recurring
 Ana Gasteyer as Karen Grisham, Maria's agent
 Ed Begley Jr. with Kurt Braunohler (season 2, flashbacks) as Joel Bamford, Maria's father
 Lennon Parham as Larissa, Maria's friend
 Bridget Everett as Dagmar, Maria's friend
 Mo Collins as Susan Beeber, Maria's childhood friend
 Dean Cain as Graham, Maria's ex-fiancé
 June Diane Raphael as Karen Grisham, Maria's realtor
 Jenny Slate as Karen Grisham, Maria's life coach
 Kenny and Keith Lucas as themselves
 Yimmy Yim as Chantrelle, Bruce's assistant
 Kyle McCulloch and Piotr Michael as the voice of Bert, Maria's dog

Guest stars

Background

Concept and development 

The show came to be when Mitch Hurwitz approached Maria Bamford and asked her if she had an idea for a series, reportedly in 2013. Part of the pitch was telling a story about a mental breakdown. The project was no more than talks for years. Later, Hurwitz attached Pam Brady to the project to write and direct. Bamford described this process as "extremely slow".

The use of nonlinear narrative in the show was part of Bamford's pitch. It is used to portray the different mental states people can go through, and also how they overcome it. In that way, the show's flashbacks serve as "a reminder of that journey." Bamford describes the show's narrative structure as "Bloodline, with me."

Bamford, who is a stand-up comedian, decided not to use stand-up comedy as a device in her show. When asked about her decision, she explained: "Even though that is a reasonable way of telling the story, I do have a self-conscious feeling of "I don't want to see the same thing over and over"". This decision is depicted in the pilot episode of the series.

Writing
Maria Bamford was involved in the writing process, but she did not write any episode herself. In spite of the show being based on Bamford's real life, the writers had freedom to modify her experiences for creative purposes. For example, in the pilot episode, Maria puts a bench in front of her house in an effort to promote a sense of community in her neighborhood. This idea came from Bamford's real life.

Even though she did not take a hands-on approach in the writing of the series, she was in the writers' room often, to discuss ideas and "hang out" with the writers. Writing credits include Kyle McCulloch, former South Park writer, and Jen Statsky, former Parks and Recreation and Late Night with Jimmy Fallon writer.

Directing
Former Arrested Development collaborators Max Winkler and Andrew Fleming directed episodes for Lady Dynamite. Robert Cohen, Academy award-winner Jessica Yu and Ryan McFaul also directed episodes.

Episodes

Series overview

Season 1 (2016)

Season 2 (2017)

Reception

The first season of Lady Dynamite has received widespread acclaim from critics. On Rotten Tomatoes, it has a rating of 94%, based on 31 reviews, with an average rating of 8.2/10. The site's critical consensus reads, "Maria Bamford's Lady Dynamite is a vibrant, subversive, sweet, meta-fictional ride - but also a courageous, boundary-busting and ultimately deep portrayal of a troubled psyche." On Metacritic, the season has a score of 85 out of 100, based on 15 reviews, indicating "universal acclaim". The show has garnered attention because of its depiction of mental illness.

The New York Times described the show as "[having] its own bizarre-sincere voice and its own dream logic" and "something else, in a good way: a journey to the center of Ms. Bamford's mind that dives through fantasy after loopy fantasy and emerges with something real." About the show's style, The New York Times noted that "The show's creators, Pam Brady (South Park) and Mitch Hurwitz (Arrested Development), have constructed a multipurpose fun house; we jump about in time and flit from meta-show to memoir to hallucination."

Variety described Bamford's performance saying that "the actress and comedian, whose presence has rarely been used as well as it is here, manages the neat trick of being both believably guileless and winningly sharp." Variety also praised the show's guest stars, stating: "the entire show gains a great deal of energy from a varied array of game guest actors, including Mira Sorvino, Patton Oswalt, Ana Gasteyer, Brandon Routh, and Bridget Everett, all of whom appear delighted to be in Bamford's playfully serious orbit."

Critics have compared the series to Unbreakable Kimmy Schmidt, Community, Review and BoJack Horseman because of the way it uses meta-humor, absurdist humor and how it deals with mental health.

Accolades

See also
Portlandia (TV series), which featured a Lady Dynamite cameo at the end of season seven

References

External links
 
 

2010s American black comedy television series
2016 American television series debuts
2017 American television series endings
Bipolar disorder in fiction
English-language Netflix original programming
Metafictional television series
Nonlinear narrative television series
Surreal comedy television series
Television series about actors
Television series about show business
Television series created by Mitchell Hurwitz
Television series created by Pam Brady
Television shows filmed in Minnesota
Television shows set in Los Angeles